Qara Cheshmeh (also Romanized as Qārā Cheshmeh also known as Qarah Cheshmeh and Qareh Cheshmeh) is a village in Takht-e Jolgeh Rural District, in the Central District of Firuzeh County, Razavi Khorasan Province, Iran. At the 2006 census, its population was 52, in 13 families.

References 

Populated places in Firuzeh County